School of Leadership Afghanistan or SOLA is an all-girls boarding school in Kabul, Afghanistan. It was founded by Shabana Basij-Rasikh. It is  the first boarding school for girls in Afghanistan. 

After the Afghan government fell and the Taliban seized control in 2021, Shabana Basij-Rasikh destroyed the records of her students to avoid the Taliban from getting them.

Shabana Basij-Rasikh stated 

On 24 August 2021 it was announced that the school had temporarily relocated to Rwanda in the previous week, with 250 students and staff.

References

External links
SOLA School of Leadership Afghanistan Official  Website
 Opinion: I founded a girls’ school in Afghanistan. Don’t let our stories disappear as they have before. (Shabana Basij-Rasikh, Washington Post, Sept. 1, 2021)

Girls' schools in Afghanistan
Schools in Kabul